Mian Noor Muhammad Kalhoro (1698-1755) ruled over Sindh as Subahdar of Mughal Emperor from 1719 till 1736 when he consolidated his power over entire Sindh, subjugating Bakhar Sarkar (Northern Sindh), Sehwan Sarkar (Central Sindh), and Thatta Sarkar (Southern Sindh) under his control and thus establishing a sovereign state, independent of Mughal suzerainty.

In the year 1736, Kalhoro was officially entitled as the Kalhora Nawab of Sindh and was given the title Nawab Khuda-Yar Khan by the Mughal Emperor Muhammad Shah. In 1739, during the invasion of the Mughal Empire by Nader Shah, Mian fled to Umerkot for shelter but was captured by the King of Iran. Mian Noor Mohammad Kalhoro sent a small force to assassinate Nader Shah and turn events in favor of the Mughal Emperor during the notorious Battle of Karnal in 1739, but this plot failed.

Early history

In the 4th year of his rule, i.e. 1722, the Daudpotas took certain "aggressive measures". They fought with Mullah Jiyand Abra, who was Miyan Nur Muhammad's agent in charge of certain villages in Jatoi Parguna of Bakhar Sarkar (Northern Sindh). They further trespassed on the parganahs of Shikarpur, Khanpur, and other villages, that formed the jagir of Mir Abdul-Wasia Khan and would not give any explanation to the said Khan. Miyan Nur Muhammad therefore, sent Thariah, one of his confidential men, to the Mughal Emperor Muhammad Shah requesting that under the circumstances the jagir might be conferred on him in his own name, and at the same time marched against the Daudpotas. After some hard-fought battles he besieged them in the fort of Shikarpur and compelled them to submit. At last, a treaty was agreed upon in which that country was divided into four parts (or shares), two shares being given to the original owner of the jagir, one to the Daudpotas and one being retained by the Miyan Nur Muhammad himself, who after taking some hostages, returned to his capital.

The Daudpotas did not long remain quiet. Again and again they rose against the Kalhoras, till in 1726 Miyan Nur Muhammad fixed his residence at Shikarpur and sent his army to extirpate them finally. The army pressed them hard in the Dabli Fort, but through the intercession of some Syeds they abandoned the expedition.

The result of all this was that the land of Nahars, that had lately fallen into the hands of the Daudpotas, came back into the owner's possession, and the Daudpotas were scattered in confusion over certain parganahs of Multan, e.g. Pahli, the territory of Imam ud-Din Joyah and Farid Khan Lakhwirah, Nain, Bahawalpur, the territory of Hanas Sammah, Patan of Baba Farid and the country near the settlements of the Afghans possibly northern Baluchistan. Within two years, however, they were reduced to straitened circumstances and were obliged to seek service under Miyan Nur Muhammad, who gave them suitable pensions and places in the talukah of Bakhar, which had only recently come into the hands of the Sirais.

Similarly Sheikh Hamid and Sheikh Usman the Ronkahs, noteworthy zamindars of the suburbs of Multan, emigrated to Bakhar and entered the service of the Miyan Nur Muhammad.

Conquest of Siwi(Sibi) 

In the year 1729, Murad Kaleri Baloch, known as Ganjah Baloch, was appointed as an agent in charge of Siwi, and brought into subjection powerful chiefs like Kaisar Khan Magsi, the zamindar of Ganjabah, the chief of Shoran, descendants of Guhram Lashari, Ali Mardan Abro chief of Noushehro, the chief of Siwi, Miru Buledi, the chief of Kachhi, Mahyan Eri and Lahna Machhi, big landowners of Bhag Nari, Kala Khan and other chiefs.

Hostilities with Khan of Kalat Mir Abdullah Khan Baloch 

Miyan Nur Muhammad now commenced hostilities with the Khan of Kalat, Mir Abdullah Khan Ahmadzai who was a Baloch and who proudly called himself "the royal Eagle of Kohistán". In 1143 AH (1730 AD) he marched and took the fort of Kartah from Mubarak Khan

In 1731, a force of Baloch invaded the land of Kachhah. To punish them for this, Miyan Nur Muhammad himself marched out and encamped at Larkana. From there he dispatched some chiefs to fight with Mir Abdullah Khan. At Jandehar, where Mir Abdullah Khan had arrived in advance, a pitched battle was fought which ended in the complete overthrow of the Kalhoras.

Conquest of Siwistan and Thatta 

News arrived of Nadir Shah’s impending invasion of Mughal Empire, and Miyan Nur Muhammad began to send envoys to him to prepare the way for their friendship. In 1736 the division of Bakhar was completely secured by the Sirais, Siwistan, or Sehwan having already been brought into their possession. The next year 1737 Thatta was obtained from the Emperor Muhammad Shah, and Sheikh Ghulam Muhammad was deputed to have charge of it.

Nadir Shah's Invasion of Sindh 

Miyan Nur Muhammad being apprehensive of Nadir Shah's approach, went to Larkana in order to keep firm possession of that division, and sent his son Muhammad Muradyab Khan to Thatta, where he arrived during the year 1738. Rana Ajmal, the ruler of Dharajah and the Jam of Kakralah rose to oppose him. They brought down ships from the sea to the river and commenced war both by land and by water. The ships came as far as Khat and from there up to Nasarpur. They commenced fighting and plundering on both sides of the river. But as the guns were soon placed along the banks and fired by the Sirais, the enemy was driven back and pursued until they were compelled to submit. Soon after this, Nadir Shah's approach spread confusion throughout the country. Nadir Shah's invasion lead Miyan Nur Muhammad to take refuge at Umarkot to prepare for a siege. In 1739, Muhammad Muradyab Khan left Thatta and joined his father, who fled to Umarkot for shelter, having sent away his heavy baggage to Talhar. Early one morning, before Miyan Nur Muhammad left the fort, as he had determined to do, all of a sudden, Nadir Shah appeared at the gate. Miyan Nur Muhammad had no alternative but to surrender, having tied his own hands like an offender. The king carried him with his camp and came to Larkana.

Sindh Post-Persian Invasion 

In 1741, the tribe of Shorah, during the period of anarchy consequent on Nadir Shah's arrival, had shaken off the Miyan Nur Muhammad's yoke, began to assemble at Kand, Manani Aresar and Khir in the talukah of Chakar Halah, under the command of Hund son of Shorah chief, and to display great audacity. Miyan Nur Muhammad marched against them and without much trouble completely extirpated them. He next punished Tamachi, Toghachi, Tharu, Silah, Kahah and Asu Sumrah, the chiefs of parganah Wangah in the tálukah of Chachikan, as they would not pay the fixed tribute.

In 1155 AH (1742 AD) Muzaffar Alí Khán Bayát, Beglarbegí, who had gone to bring some ships that had been ordered by Nadír Sháh to be built for him at the port of Súrat, came to Tattá from Karáchi port, Nawab Sháh Kulí Khán (Mián Núr Muhammad) came to receive him at Tattá, where they spent about two months and a half together, after which period Muzaffar Alí took his departure.

In 1156 AH, Tahmásb Kulí Khán, the chief of Jaláir
Fresh anarchy in Sind in consequence of Tahmásb Kulí Khán's coming.
had been sent by Nádir Sháh to punish the Dáúdpótáhs. Mián Núr Muhammad thought it expedient to remain quiet and not take any part in the affair. Consequently, anarchy broke out anew in Sind, during which Sultán Sámtiah, the administrator of Tattá and Shekh Shukrulláh were called away by the Mián and the charge of the place given to Razábeg the king's envoy and another noble by name Fázilbeg. These two thought it proper to conclude a treaty of peace with the Ráná of Dhárájah and Sájan Ramah, the Hindú chiefs of neighbouring states. But when subsequently the Mián received Tahmásb Kulí Khán, who departed with the Mián's third son Atur Khán as a hostage, Sultán Sámtiah and Shekh Shukrulláh were again sent to take up the administration of Tattá.

Fighting with certain Hindu chiefs 

In 1157 AH (1744 AD) Shaykh Shukrullah a Sindhi war-chief sent by Mian Noor Mohammad Kalhoro defeated Hothí the chief of the Kakralah a Hindu tribe which had built the fort of Kanji, the Hindus of that region had a long blood-feud with the Samma tribe (Muslim). Shaykh Shukrullah after a long conflict killed Hothi, and placed Jám Máhar Samma in his place. The next year the Mían Noor Mohammad Kalhoro himself proceeded to attack the fort of Kanjí and took it. As the Hindus of Kuch had, after the conquest of Kánji, come to Badín and other neighboring places, the Mián determined to punish them. In 1158 AH Bahár Sháh and other Sindhi warriors and even Sufi Fakirs had been deputed by Mían Noor Mohammad Kalhoro in order to maintain peace in the region but after another Hindu rebellion, the Hindus were completely overpowered and disarmed. Sultán Samtiah the commander martyred in the conflict was buried on the Maklí Hills and his place given to his son Masú Fakír.

Fighting with the Rana of Dharajah 

In 1160 AH (1747 AD) at the instigation of the Ráná of Dhárájah, some hundreds of Hindu hill tribes invaded the city of Thatta. Masú Fakír, Shekh Shukrulláh, and Búlah Khán Naomardiah Jakhrah,* advanced to meet them. As the hill people had been sacrilegious enough to pass through graveyards without respect for the tombs or the spirits of the dead, they were completely routed on the third day, though on the other side there were comparatively few persons. Getting this news, the Mián's son Muhammad Khudádád Khán came to Thatta with a large army. Masú Fakír was removed from the charge of Tattá and Biláwal Fakír Náij was appointed in his place, who immediately marched against the Ráná's fort. The Ráná betook himself across the river and left the place to some of his men to defend. But they could not stand against such an overwhelming force. The fort fell into the hands of the Mian's son, who returned victorious to his father. Shortly after this Shekh Shukrulláh caused the Ráná to be killed by Bijár Jókhiah, who treacherously secured his presence to discuss terms of peace.

The Mian receives the title of Shahnawaz Khan and his sons return from Persia 

In 1161 AH (1748 A D.) Ahmad Sháh Dúrání, who settled the boundaries of Nádir Sháh's share of the country with the Emperor of Dehlí, and secured it for himself,* confirmed Mián Núr Muhammad as the ruler of Sind, giving him the new title of “Sháhna wáz Khán.” In the next year, the Mián's sons Ghulám Sháh and Atur Khán, who had been taken away as hostages, returned from Persia. In 1163 AH. (1750, AD) Gul Muhammad Khurásání became the Miáns agent at Tattá. In the same year, news was received of the Miáns third son Murádyáb Khán's arrival at Muscat and the death of Shekh Ghulám Muhammad, who had been in his company. Accordingly, Shukrulláh Khán was ordered to proceed immediately to bring the young nobleman home.

In 1164 AH (1751 AD) ships left for the port of Muscat, but Shekh Shukrulláh died soon after. In due course of time Muhammad Murádyáb Khán arrived and was received with great affection by his father, who entrusted him with the entire management of the financial business of the state and appointed Khudábád to be his headquarters. Sháhnawáz Khán, who used to be at Khudábád, came to reside at the newly built town of Muhammadábád. Khudádád Khán, who during the absence of his elder brother, had put on the turban of an heir-apparent, had now to resign that honourable position to the rightful owner Murádváb Khán. Being much chagrined and mortified at this, he left his native land and went to Hindustán. But Muhammad Murádyáb Khán soon proved a failure as a financial manager and so that office was taken back from him.

The king comes to Sind and Diwan Gidumal is sent as an envoy to him 

At the beginning of 1166 AH (1753 AD) it was rumoured that Sardár Jahán Khán was coming to Sind. And about the close of the year, a different rumour was circulated to the effect that the king himself was coming in order to pass on to Hindustán.* On the 4th of Muharram, 1168 AH (1755 AD) information was received that the king had moved from Muhammadàbád to the sand-hills. Diwán Gidúmal was therefore sent in a hurry as an envoy to meet him at his camp and assure him of the Mián's loyalty and faithfulness, and if possible to induce him to turn back without marching further by the route. The Diwán met the king's camp at the bridge of Sakhar.* As the king was angry and out of humour, the Diwán could not get an audience for 3 days. At last the king encamped at Naoshahrah. Here Diwán Gidúmal was fortunate enough to secure the king's audience and to conciliate him.*

Death of Mian Noor Muhammad and the election of his son Muradyab Khan 

It was about this time, on the 12th of Saffar of the same year 1168 AH (1755 AD) that the ruler of Sind Mián Núr Muhammad died of quinsy or the inflammation of the throat in the vicinity of Jesalmer.

The nobles of the state lost no time in electing the late ruler's eldest son Muhammad Murádyáb Khán to the throne. That young nobleman, fearing lest he might be again given away as a hostage, had left his father on the way and betaken himself in a different direction, from which he had to be brought to fill the vacant throne. This ceremony of enthronement took place on 16th, i.e. 4 days after the late Mián's death.

References 

 This article includes content derived from "History of Sind – translated from Persian books" by Mirza Kalichbeg Fredunbeg (1853–1929), published in Karachi in 1902 and now in the public domain.

Sindhi people
Pakistani royalty
Kalhora dynasty
Mughal Empire
1698 births
1747 deaths